Tokelau (known previously as the Union Islands, and, until 1976, known officially as the Tokelau Islands) is a dependent territory of New Zealand in the southern Pacific Ocean. It consists of three tropical coral atolls: Atafu, Nukunonu, and Fakaofo. The capital rotates yearly among the three atolls. In addition to these three, Swains Island, which forms part of the same archipelago, is the subject of an ongoing territorial dispute; it is currently administered by the United States as part of American Samoa. Tokelau lies north of the Samoan Islands, east of Tuvalu, south of the Phoenix Islands, southwest of the more distant Line Islands, and northwest of the Cook Islands.

Tokelau has a population of approximately 1,500 people; it has the fourth-smallest population of any sovereign state or dependency in the world. As of the 2016 census, around 45% of its residents had been born overseas, mostly in Samoa or New Zealand. The populace has a life expectancy of 69, which is comparable to that of other Oceanian island nations. Approximately 94% of the population speak Tokelauan as their first language. Tokelau has the smallest economy of any nation, although it is a leader in renewable energy, being the first 100% solar-powered nation in the world.

Tokelau is officially referred to as a nation by both the New Zealand government and the Tokelauan government. It is a free and democratic nation with elections every three years. However, in 2007, the United Nations General Assembly included Tokelau on its list of non-self-governing territories. Its inclusion on this list is controversial, as Tokelauans have twice narrowly voted against further self-determination, and the islands' small population makes the viability of self-government challenging. The basis of Tokelau's legislative, administrative and judicial systems is the Tokelau Islands Act 1948, which has been amended several times. Since 1993, the territory has annually elected its own head of government, the Ulu-o-Tokelau. Before 1993, the administrator of Tokelau was the highest official in the government and the territory was directly administered by a New Zealand government department.

Etymology
 is a word meaning "north wind" in the native Tokelau language. The Tokelau islands were named the Union Islands and Union Group by European explorers at an earlier time. Tokelau Islands was adopted as the islands’ official name in 1946. The name was officially shortened to Tokelau on 9 December 1976.

History

Pre-history
Archaeological evidence indicates that the atolls of Tokelau – Atafu, Nukunonu, and Fakaofo – were settled about 1,000 years ago from Samoa and may have been a gateway into Eastern Polynesia. The inhabitants embrace Polynesian mythology and the local god, Tui Tokelau. Over time, they developed distinctive musical and art forms. The three atolls have historically functioned separately politically, while maintaining social and linguistic cohesion. Tokelauan society has been governed by chiefly clans, and there have been occasional skirmishes and wars between the atolls, as well as inter-marriage. Fakaofo, the "chiefly island", held some dominion over Atafu and Nukunonu after the dispersal of Atafu. Life on the atolls was historically subsistence-based, with a diet that relied mainly on fish and coconut.

Contact with other cultures

The first European to sight Atafu was Commodore John Byron, on 24 June 1765. He called the island "Duke of York's Island". Parties from his expedition who ventured ashore reported that there were no signs of current or previous inhabitants. Captain Edward Edwards, having learned of Byron's discovery, visited Atafu on 6 June 1791 in search of the Bounty mutineers. They found no inhabitants, but saw that there were houses containing canoes and fishing gear, which suggested to them that the island was being used as a temporary residence by fishing parties from other, nearby islands. On 12 June 1791, Edwards sailed farther south,  and sighted Nukunonu, naming it "Duke of Clarence's Island". A landing party that went ashore was unable to make contact with the inhabitants, but saw "morais", burying places, and canoes with "stages in their middle" sailing across the island's lagoons.

On 29 October 1825, August R. Strong of the USS Dolphin and his crew arrived at the atoll Nukunonu. He wrote: Upon examination, we found they had removed all the women and children from the settlement, which was quite small, and put them in canoes lying off a rock in the lagoon. They would frequently come near the shore, but when we approached they would pull off with great noise and precipitation.

On 14 February 1835, Captain Smith, of the United States whaling ship the General Jackson, wrote of having sighted Fakaofo, which he chose to call "D'Wolf's Island". On 25 January 1841, the United States Exploring Expedition visited Atafu, and discovered a small population living on the island. The residents appeared to be there only temporarily, because there was no chief among them, and they had the kind of double canoes that were typically used for inter-island travel. They appeared to have interacted with foreigners in the past, because they expressed a desire to engage in barter with the expedition crew, and they possessed items that were apparently of foreign origin: blue beads and a plane-iron. A few days later, French explorer Captain Morvan sighted Fakaofo. The American expedition reached Nukunonu on 28 January 1841, but did not record any information about inhabitants. On 29 January 1841, the expedition sighted Fakaofo and named it "Bowditch". The Fakaofo islanders were found to be similar in appearance and behavior to the Atafu islanders.

Missionaries preached Christianity in Tokelau from 1845 to the 1870s. French Catholic missionaries on Wallis Island (also known as 'Uvea) and missionaries of the Protestant London Missionary Society in Samoa used native teachers to convert the Tokelauans. Atafu was converted to Protestantism by the London Missionary Society, Nukunonu was converted to Catholicism and Fakaofo was converted to both denominations. The Rev. Samuel James Whitmee, of the London Missionary Society, visited Tokelau in 1870.

Helped by Swains Island-based Eli Jennings senior, Peruvian "blackbird"  slave traders arrived in 1863 and kidnapped nearly all (253) of the able-bodied men to work as labourers, depopulating the atolls. The Tokelauan men died of dysentery and smallpox, and very few returned. With that loss, the system of governance became based on the "Taupulega", or "Councils of Elders", on which individual families on each atoll were represented. During that time, Polynesian immigrants settled, followed by American, Scottish, French, Portuguese and German beachcombers, marrying local women and repopulating the atolls.

Between 1856 and 1979, the United States claimed that it held sovereignty over the island and the other Tokelauan atolls. In 1979, the U.S. conceded that Tokelau was under New Zealand sovereignty, and a maritime boundary between Tokelau and American Samoa was established by the Treaty of Tokehega.

Tropical cyclones
Cyclone Percy struck and severely damaged Tokelau in late February and early March 2005. Forecasters underestimated the cyclone's strength and the length of time it would be in vicinity to Tokelau. It coincided with a spring tide which put most of the area of the two villages on Fakaofo and Nukunonu under a metre of seawater. The cyclone also caused major erosion on several islets of all three atolls, damaging roads and bridges and disrupting electric power and telecommunications systems. The cyclone did significant and widespread damage to food crops including bananas, coconuts and pandanus. It did not seriously injure anyone but villagers lost significant amounts of property.

This means Tokelau is particularly vulnerable to any possible sea level rises.

Time zone

Until December 2011, Tokelau was 11 hours behind Coordinated Universal Time (UTC). At midnight 29 December 2011 Tokelau shifted to UTC+13:00 in response to Samoa's decision to switch sides of the International Dateline. This brought Tokelau closer to New Zealand time (and in the process omitted 30 December).

Many sources claim that Tokelau is 14 hours ahead of UTC (UTC−10 before the 2011 date switch), but the correct time zone offset is UTC+13:00.

Government

In 1877, the islands were included under the protection of the United Kingdom by an Order in Council that claimed jurisdiction over all unclaimed Pacific Islands. Commander C. F. Oldham on HMS Egeria landed at each of the three atolls in June 1889 and officially raised the Union Flag, declaring the group a British protectorate. In conformity with desire expressed by "the Native government" they were annexed by the United Kingdom and included in the Gilbert Islands by the Tokelau Islands (Union Islands) Order in Council, 1916. The annexation took place on 29 February 1916. From the point in time that the islands were annexed, their people had the status of British subjects. Tokelau was removed from the Gilbert and Ellice Islands Colony and placed under the jurisdiction of the Governor-General of New Zealand in 1925, two Orders in Council being made for the purpose on the same day. This step meant that New Zealand took over administration of Tokelau from the British on 11 February 1926. At this point, Tokelau was still a territory under the sovereignty of the United Kingdom but administered by New Zealand.

The Union Islands (Revocation) Order in Council, 1948 after reciting the agreement by the governments of the United Kingdom and New Zealand that the islands should become part of New Zealand, revoked the Union Islands (No. 2) Order in Council, 1925, with effect from a date fixed by the Governor-General of New Zealand after he was satisfied that the New Zealand Parliament had provided for the incorporation of the islands with New Zealand, as it did by the Tokelau Islands Act 1948. Tokelau formally became part of New Zealand on 1 January 1949.

The Dominion of New Zealand, of which Tokelau formerly was a part, has since been superseded by the Realm of New Zealand, of which Tokelau remains a part. Defence is the responsibility of New Zealand. When the British Nationality and New Zealand Citizenship Act 1948 came into effect on 1 January 1949, Tokelauans who were British subjects gained New Zealand citizenship; a status they still hold.

Villages are entitled to enact their own laws regulating their daily lives and New Zealand law only applies where it has been extended by specific enactment. Serious crime is rare and there are no prisons, and offenders are publicly rebuked, fined or made to work.

Politics

The  is represented in the territory by the Administrator – currently Don Higgins. The current head of government is Siopili Perez, who presides over the Council for the Ongoing Government of Tokelau, which functions as a cabinet. The Council consists of the faipule (leader) and pulenuku (village mayor) of each of the three atolls. The administrator is appointed by the minister of Foreign Affairs and Trade of New Zealand, and the role of head of government rotates between the three faipule for a one-year term.

The Tokelau Amendment Act of 1996 confers legislative power on the General Fono, a unicameral body. The number of seats each atoll receives in the Fono is determined by population – at present, Fakaofo and Atafu each have seven and Nukunonu has six. Faipule and pulenuku also sit in the Fono.

On 11 November 2004, Tokelau and New Zealand took steps to formulate a treaty that would turn Tokelau from a non-self-governing territory to a self-governing state in free association with New Zealand. Besides the treaty, a United Nations-sponsored referendum on self-determination took place, with the three islands voting on successive days starting 13 February 2006. (Tokelauans in Apia, Samoa, voted on 11 February.) Out of 581 votes cast, 349 were for Free Association, being short of the two-thirds majority required for the measure to pass. The referendum was profiled (somewhat light-heartedly) in the 1 May 2006 issue of The New Yorker magazine. A repeat referendum took place on 20–24 October 2007, again narrowly failing to approve self-government. This time the vote was short by just 16 votes or 3%.

In May 2008, the United Nations' Secretary General Ban Ki-moon urged colonial powers "to complete the decolonization process in every one of the remaining 16 non-self-governing territories", including Tokelau. This led The New Zealand Herald to comment that the United Nations was "apparently frustrated by two failed attempts to get Tokelau to vote for independence". In April 2008, speaking as leader of the National Party, future New Zealand Prime Minister John Key stated that New Zealand had "imposed two referenda on the people of the Tokelau Islands", and questioned "the accepted wisdom that small states should undergo a de-colonisation process".

Geography

Tokelau includes three atolls in the South Pacific Ocean between longitudes 171° W and 173° W and between latitudes 8° S and 10° S, about midway between Hawaii and New Zealand. From Atafu in the north to Fakaofo in the south, Tokelau extends for less than 200 km. The atolls are Atafu and Nukunonu, both in an island group once called the Duke of Clarence Group, and Fakaofo, once Bowditch Island. The atolls each have a number of coral islands, where the villages are situated. There are no ports or harbours for large vessels, however, all three atolls have a jetty to and from which supplies and passengers are shipped. Tokelau lies in the Pacific tropical cyclone belt. A fourth island that is culturally, historically, and geographically, but not politically, a part of the Tokelau Islands is Swains Island (Olohega), under United States control since about 1900 and administered as a part of American Samoa since 1925.

Swains Island was claimed by the United States pursuant to the Guano Islands Act, as were the other three islands of Tokelau; the latter three claims were ceded to Tokelau by treaty in 1979. In the draft constitution of Tokelau subject to the Tokelauan self-determination referendum in 2006, Olohega (Swains Island) was also claimed as a part of Tokelau, though the claim was surrendered in the same 1979 treaty. This established a clearly defined boundary between American Samoa and Tokelau.

Tokelau's claim to Swains is generally comparable to the Marshall Islands' claim to U.S.-administered Wake Island, but the re-emergence of this somewhat dormant issue has been an unintended result of the United Nations' recent efforts to promote decolonisation in Tokelau. Tokelauans have proven somewhat reluctant to push their national identity in the political realm: recent decolonisation moves have mainly been driven from outside for ideological reasons. But at the same time, Tokelauans are reluctant to disown their common cultural identity with Swains Islanders who speak their language.

Environment

Tokelau is located in the Western Polynesian tropical moist forests ecoregion. Most of the original vegetation has been replaced by coconut plantations, some of which have been abandoned and became scrubby forests. The atolls of Tokelau provide habitat for 38 indigenous plant species, over 150 insect species and 10 land crab species. One of the greatest threats to biodiversity is posed by introduced mammalian predators such as the Polynesian Rat.

In 2011 Tokelau declared its entire exclusive economic zone of  a shark sanctuary.

Economy

According to the US Central Intelligence Agency's list of countries by GDP (PPP) Tokelau has the smallest economy in the world. Tokelau has an annual purchasing power of about US$1,000 (€674) per capita. The government is almost entirely dependent on subsidies from New Zealand. It has annual revenues of less than US$500,000 (€336,995) against expenditures of some US$2.8 million (€1.9 million). The deficit is made up by aid from New Zealand.

Tokelau annually exports around US$100,000 (€67,000) of stamps, copra and woven and carved handicrafts and imports over US$300,000 (€202,000) of foodstuffs, building materials, and fuel to, and from, New Zealand. New Zealand also pays directly for the cost of medical and education services. Local industries include small-scale enterprises for copra production, wood work, plaited craft goods, stamps, coins, and fishing. Agriculture and livestock produces coconuts, copra, breadfruit, papayas, bananas, figs, pigs, poultry and a few goats. Many Tokelauans live in New Zealand and support their families in Tokelau through remittances.

Solar power
The goal of 100% renewable electricity was met on 7 November 2012, according to the Foreign Affairs Minister of New Zealand, Murray McCully. Previously electricity was generated using diesel generators and was only available about 16 hours/day.

Three solar power stations with a total generation capacity of 930kWp were installed to provide 100% of current electrical demand from photovoltaics, with lead acid battery backup able to store around 8MWh. The first power station was completed in August 2012. In total, 4,032 solar panels are used and 1,344 batteries weighing  each. By 2011, Tokelau's electricity was 93% generated by photovoltaics, with the remainder generated from coconut oil. As of 2019, increased demand and degradation of batteries had led to increased need for backup power. Plans were made for an additional 210 kW of PV and close to 2MWh of lithium-ion battery capacity.

Internet domain name

Tokelau has increased its GDP by more than 10% through registrations of domain names under its top-level domain, .tk. Registrations can be either free, in which case the user owns only usage rights and not the domain itself, or paid, which grants full rights. Free domains are pointed to Tokelau name servers, which redirects the domain via HTML frames to a specified address or to a specified A or NS record, and the redirection of up to 250 email addresses to an external address (not at a .tk domain).

In September 2003 Fakaofo became the first part of Tokelau with a high-speed Internet connection. Foundation Tokelau financed the project. Tokelau gives most domain names under its authority away to anyone for free to gain publicity for the territory. This has allowed the nation to gain enhanced telecommunications technologies, such as more computers and Internet access for Tokelauan residents. By 2012, there were about 120 computers, mostly laptops, and 1/6th of the economy consists of income from .tk domain names.

According to a 2016 analysis of domain name registration performed by the .uk registrar Nominet using data from ZookNIC, tk domains are the "world's largest country-code domain ... almost as large as second and third place holders China (.cn) and Germany (.de) combined".

Demographics

According to the 2016 Tokelau Census, Tokelau has a de jure usually resident population of 1,499 people. The census shows a 6.2% increase in the de jure usually resident population between 2011 and 2016.

The nationals of Tokelau are called Tokelauans, and the major ethnic group is Polynesian; it has no recorded minority groups. About 84% of inhabitants are of wholly or partly Tokelauan ethnicity; people of Samoan ethnicity make up 6.7% of the population, and Tuvaluans 2.8%. The main language—spoken by over 90% of inhabitants—is Tokelauan, but almost 60% also speak English.

The less than 1,500 Polynesian inhabitants live in three villages. Their isolation and lack of resources greatly limits economic development and confines agriculture to the subsistence level. The very limited natural resources and overcrowding are contributing to emigration to New Zealand and Samoa. In the 2013 New Zealand census, more than 7,000 people identified as Tokelauan, almost five times as many as live in Tokelau itself. Depletion of tuna has made fishing for food more difficult.

A significant proportion (44.9% in 2016) of the population were born overseas, mostly in Samoa (15.3% of total population) and New Zealand (11.5%).

While slightly more females than males live on Atafu and Fakaofo, males make up 57% of Nukunonu residents. Only 9% of Tokelauans aged 40 or more have never been married. One-quarter of the population were born overseas; almost all the rest live on the same atoll they were born on. Most households own five or more pigs.

Despite its low income, Tokelau has a life expectancy of 69 years, comparable with other Oceania islands.

Religion 

Tokelau is predominantly Christian. On the island of Atafu almost all inhabitants are members of the Congregational Christian Church of Samoa (corresponding to 62% of the total population). On Nukunonu almost all are Roman Catholic (corresponding to 34% of the total population). On Fakaofo both denominations are present with the Congregational Christian Church predominant. 5% of the population follow other religions.

Culture

Healthcare and education

Each atoll has a school and hospital. The health services have a Director of Health in Apia and a Chief Clinical Advisor who moves from atoll to atoll as required to assist the doctors attached to each hospital. In 2007 there was not always a doctor on each island and locums were appointed to fill the gaps.

Many Tokelauan youth travel to New Zealand to further their education and Tokelau is most populated around the Christmas season, with students returning home and then heading off for another year of study.

Sport

Due to its small size, Tokelau is unaffiliated to most international sports organisations, and rarely takes part in international events. The only significant international competition Tokelau takes part in is the Pacific Games. Tokelau won its first-ever gold medals at the 2007 Pacific Games in Apia, winning a total of five medals (three gold, a silver and a bronze), all in lawn bowls, and finishing 12th (out of 22) on the overall medal table. This included two gold medals for Violina Linda Pedro (in the women's pairs and the women's singles), making her Tokelau's most successful individual athlete to date.

In October 2010, table tennis became "the first sport in Tokelau to be granted membership at a Continental or World level", when the Tokelau Table Tennis Association was formally established and became the 23rd member of the Oceania Table Tennis Federation.

Tokelau was due to take part, for the first time, in the 2010 Commonwealth Games, in Delhi, but, for unknown reasons, ultimately did not do so.

Tokelau has a National Sports Federation, and a significant sporting event is the Tokelau Games, which are held yearly. When they are held, "all of Tokelau virtually stands still", as "[i]n excess of 50% of the population take part and all work and school stops at the time". The 2010 Games included competitions in rugby sevens, netball and kilikiti, alongside "a cultural evening [...] where each atoll showcases their traditional songs and dances".

Netball is thought to have been introduced to Tokelau by the British, but became more popular when New Zealand's government took over the territory. The sport is often played during inter-island sport competitions, alongside other sports like rugby league and volleyball.

In Tokelau, there are two levels to the football league. From Fale, Fakaofo, two of the best clubs are Hakava Club and Matalele Club.

Communication and transportation

Tokelau has a radio telephone service between the islands and to Samoa. In 1997, a government-regulated telephone service (TeleTok) with three satellite earth stations was established. Each atoll has a radio-broadcast station that broadcasts shipping and weather reports and every household has a radio or access to one. News is disseminated through the government newsletter Te Vakai.

Tokelau has the international calling code of 690, and has had five-digit telephone numbers from November 2015 (the existing four-digit numbers were prefixed by the digit "2").

Tokelau is served by the MV Mataliki, delivered new in 2016 as a replacement of the smaller MV Tokelau and jointly managed by the Tokelau Transport Department and the company Transport and Marine. The vessel, which has a capacity of 60 passengers on international cruises and 120 for transport between the atolls of Tokelau, operates fortnightly between Tokelau and Apia, with the trip taking a little over a day. A dedicated cargo vessel, the MV Kalopaga, will enter service in 2018 and replace chartered freight vessels.

Ships load and unload cargo by motoring up to the down-wind (leeward) side of the islet where the people live and maintaining station, by intermittent use of engines, close to the reef edge so that a landing barge can be motored out to transfer cargo to or from the shore. On returning to shore, the barge negotiates a narrow channel through the reef to the beach. Usually this landing is subject to ocean swell and beaching requires considerable skill and, often, coral abrasions to bodies. When bad weather prevents the barge making the trip, the ship stands off to wait for suitable weather or goes off to one of the other atolls to attempt to load or unload its passengers or cargo, or both.

There is no airport in Tokelau, so boats are the main means of travel and transport. Some seaplanes and amphibious aircraft are able to land in the island's lagoons. An airstrip was considered by the New Zealand Government in 2010. In 2016, plans to link the atolls with Samoa by helicopter had to be abandoned because of high costs, leading in the following years to renewed calls to the New Zealand government for help with establishing air services.

See also

 Badge of Tokelau
 Outline of Tokelau

Notes

References

Further reading

External links

 Tokelau. The World Factbook. Central Intelligence Agency.
 Tokelau from UCB Libraries GovPubs
 
 
 Ethnology of Tokelau Islands

Governance
 Tokelau Council of Ongoing Government, executive branch of the government
 The Administrator of Tokelau, Tokelau website of the NZ Ministry of Foreign Affairs and Trade

Atolls
 Fakaofo
 Nukunonu

 
1948 establishments in Oceania
Atolls of New Zealand
British Western Pacific Territories
Dependent territories of New Zealand
English-speaking countries and territories
Geography of Polynesia
Island countries
States and territories established in 1948